The South Ossetia National Football Team, is the national team of South Ossetia. They are not affiliated with FIFA or UEFA and therefore cannot compete for the FIFA World Cup or the UEFA European Championship. South Ossetia made its debut against Abkhazia in Sukhumi on 23 September 2013 where they suffered a 3–0 defeat.

South Ossetia competed at the first ConIFA World Football Cup in 2014 finishing in fourth place overall and won the 2019 ConIFA European championship.

History
The Football Federation of South Ossetia was created in 1997 and its futsal team made its official debut in the 2010 UEFS Futsal Men's Championship, finishing seventh. Two years later, it finished eighth.

The football team played its first match ever on 23 September 2013. It was a friendly match against Abkhazia and it was defeated by 0–3. One year later, it was admitted in the Confederation of Independent Football Associations and made their international debut in the 2014 ConIFA World Football Cup, where they finished in the fourth place overall.

In 2015, South Ossetia was going to make their debut in the CONIFA European Football Cup in Hungary, but their players were not allowed to travel due to pressures of the Ministry of Foreign Affairs of Georgia.

On 9 June 2019, South Ossetia won its first European Championship by defeating Western Armenia in the final.

International record

At CONIFA World Football Cup

At CONIFA European Football Cup

Current squad
The following 23 players were called up to the squad for the 2019 CONIFA European Football Cup.

Top goalscorers
Only matches at CONIFA tournaments are counted.

Matches played

Managers

President

References

External links 

 
CONIFA member associations
European national and official selection-teams not affiliated to FIFA
Georgia national football team
Football in South Ossetia
football